Municipal elections were held on 16 March 2022 in 333 municipalities in the Netherlands. This election determined the composition of the municipal councils for the following four years.

Background 
In the previous municipal elections, local political parties won by far the most votes and seats. Nationally, all local political parties won a total of 29% of the votes and around a third of municipal council seats. Local parties have seen a steady rise since the 1990s and in Vlieland there are only local parties that participate.

Of all national political parties, the Christian Democratic Appeal (CDA) will contest the most municipal elections; the party will be on the ballot in all but five (Diemen, Ouder-Amstel, Rozendaal, Vlieland and Schiermonnikoog). The People's Party for Freedom and Democracy (VVD) comes in second, contesting in 317 elections, while Democrats 66 participates in 289 elections. The Labour Party (PvdA) will participate in 303 elections, and GroenLinks in 229, many of which are joint lists between the two parties. Meanwhile, the ChristianUnion runs in 175 and the Reformed Political Party (SGP) in 96, with these parties also having many joint lists. The Socialist Party participates in 86, Forum for Democracy (FvD), which had previously only participated in Amsterdam, has expanded significantly to participate in 50 elections. The Party for Freedom (PVV) participates in 31, Party for the Animals (PvdD) in 30, DENK in 20, 50PLUS in 19 and BIJ1 in 5. There are also 3 national parties participating for the first time in municipal elections, BvNL in 20 municipalities, Volt in 10, and JA21 only in Amsterdam.

Twelve municipalities will not have elections on 16 March due to mergers.

Electoral system 
Municipal councils are elected using party-list proportional representation. The number of seats depends on the population of the municipality, ranging from nine seats for municipalities with a population below 3,000, to 45 seats for municipalities with a population over 200,000. All people above the age of 18, who are registered in a municipality, and have not been excluded from voting following a court's decision are eligible to vote. Dutch citizenship is not required to be eligible to vote for municipal elections, non-EU nationals who have legally resided in the Netherlands for at least five years and EU citizens are also eligible to vote.

National

Opinion polling

Results

Amsterdam

Opinion polling

Results

Rotterdam

Opinion polling

Results

The Hague

Opinion polling

Results

Utrecht

Opinion polling

Results

Groningen

Opinion polling

Results

Nijmegen

Results

Notes

References

External links 
 

2022 elections in the Netherlands
2022
March 2022 events in the Netherlands